On 1 December 2021, a gang of armed men broke into a prison in Tula de Allende, Hidalgo state, Mexico.

Incident 
At around 4am on 1 December 2021, gangsters arrived at the building, they proceeded to car-ram and then blow up a pair of vehicles, catching the prison guards' attention. Gunshots were fired by the criminals.

Just as local security forces began to react, two more cars exploded, allowing the gang to successfully storm the jail.

Aftermath 
Nine inmates were freed, including José Artemio Maldonado Mejía, more well known as "El Michoacano", a local drug lord and head of a Mexican drug cartel, the Pueblos Unidos. The next day, Mexican police managed to recapture three inmates and 8 criminals involved in the prison raid.

Two law enforcement officers, one a policeman and the second a guard, were injured in the attack.

The government of Hidalgo has launched an investigation aiming to track the criminals down. The program is still ongoing.

Car bombs are a rare occurrence in Mexico; the most notable example of their usage occurring in 2010.

References 

2021 crimes in Mexico
21st century in Hidalgo (state)
Attacks on buildings and structures in 2021
Attacks on buildings and structures in Mexico
Car and truck bombings in North America
Crime in Hidalgo (state)
December 2021 crimes in North America
December 2021 events in Mexico
Explosions in Mexico
Improvised explosive device bombings in 2021
Battles of the Mexican drug war
Organized crime conflicts in Mexico
Organized crime events in Mexico
Prison escapes
Violent non-state actor incidents in Mexico
Prison uprisings in Mexico
Attacks in Mexico in 2021